World Congress of Rusyns ( / Svitovŷj kongres rusyniv) is the central event of the international Rusyn community. Its executive committee is called the World Council of Rusyns and currently has ten members: nine representing various countries in which most Rusyns live, and one ex officio voting member, the current chairperson of the World Forum of Rusyn Youth. The longtime chairman of the Congress was historian Paul Robert Magocsi, who now holds the title of Honorary President.International activities of WCR are focused on two main issues:
 Further development and improvement of Rusyn minority rights in various countries that had already recognized Rusyns as a distinctive national minority.
 Continuation of efforts and initiatives aimed to achieve such recognition for other Rusyn communities, particularly those in Ukraine and some other countries.

Various congressional committees were also formed, dealing specifically with questions related to minority rights and cultural issues (religion, education, language). WCR bodies were not consulted by a group of linguists (including Aleksandr Dulichenko) who decided (in April 2019) to support a proposal that was addressed to the International Organization for Standardization (ISO), requesting suppression of the ISO 639-3 code for Rusyn language (rue) and its division into two distinctive and separate languages. In January 2020, the ISO authorities rejected the request.

In July 2019, various questions related to Rusyn language were discussed at the 15th plenary meeting of WCR that was held in Kamienka (Slovakia), focusing mainly on its former (2012) and current (after 2014) status in Ukraine. In the final conclusions, the aforementioned process (at ISO) was not addressed.

In November 2020, Đura Papuga, former WCR president from 2009 until 2015, decided to support the previously mentioned group of linguists, who formulated a new proposal, also addressed to the ISO, requesting recognition for one of Rusyn linguistic varieties (Pannonian Rusyn) as a new and separate language, under the proposed name: Ruthenian language. The request is still under deliberation.

The last (16th) biannual meeting of WCR was held between the 9 and 11 September 2021 in Krynica, Poland. It is also proposed that the 17th biannual meeting in 2023 should be held in Novi Sad, Serbia.

Meetings 

 1st 1991, Medzilaborce, Slovakia
 2nd 1993, Legnica, Poland
 3rd 1995, Ruski Krstur, Serbia
 4th 1997, Budapest, Hungary
 5th 1999, Uzhhorod, Ukraine
 6th 2001, Prague, Czech Republic 
 7th 2003, Presov, Slovakia 
 8th 2005, Krynica, Poland
 9th 2007, Sighetu Marmației, Romania 
10th 2009, Ruski Krstur, Serbia and Petrovci, Croatia
11th 2011, Pilisszentkereszt, Hungary
12th 2013, Uzhhorod, Ukraine
13th 2015, Deva, Romania
14th 2017, Osijek, Croatia
15th 2019, Kamienka, Slovakia
16th 2021, Krynica, Poland

References

Sources

External links 
 World Congress of Rusyns (official site)
 World Congress of Rusyns (1st-7th): Articles and Documents
 World Congress of Rusyns (4th-9th): Articles
 Academy of Rusyn Culture: Reports from 8th and 9th Congress
 The 9th World Congress of Rusyns (2007): Speeches
 The 10th World Congress of Rusyns (2009): Reports and Speeches, in Rusyn
 Ruthen Press
 Rusnak Info

Conferences
Rusyn culture